John Neil Shepherd (born 9 November 1943) is a Barbadian former cricketer who played in five Test matches for the West Indies cricket team between 1969 and 1971. Shepherd had a long career in English county cricket for Kent County Cricket Club and Gloucestershire County Cricket Club. He was born in Belleplaine, St Andrew in Barbados and played for the Barbados cricket team in his early career.

Shepherd made his Test debut against England in Manchester, taking five wickets. He was a Wisden Cricketer of the Year in 1979.

Although Shepherd's Test career was short, he played a remarkable amount of first-class cricket in a variety of venues: he played in both South Africa and Rhodesia, played 15 years for Kent and seven for Gloucestershire. He was the Cricket Professional at Eastbourne College in the early 1990s and President of Kent for 2011 where, as of 2017, he sits on the committee.

See also
 List of West Indies cricketers who have taken five-wicket hauls on Test debut

References

External links

1943 births
Living people
West Indies Test cricketers
Barbados cricketers
Gloucestershire cricketers
Kent cricketers
Barbadian cricketers
Rhodesia cricketers
International Cavaliers cricketers
Wisden Cricketers of the Year
Cricketers who have taken five wickets on Test debut
Presidents of Kent County Cricket Club
Barbadian expatriate sportspeople in South Africa
D. H. Robins' XI cricketers
Barbadian emigrants to England